Richard Alexandre Birkheun Rodrigues (born 11 October 1999), simply known as Richard, is a Brazilian footballer who plays as a winger for Portuguesa, on loan from CRB.

Career statistics

References

External links

1999 births
Living people
Brazilian footballers
Brazilian expatriate footballers
Association football forwards
Sport Club Internacional players
Vila Nova Futebol Clube players
C.D. Tondela players
Belenenses SAD players
Botafogo Futebol Clube (SP) players
Associação Atlética Ponte Preta players
Clube de Regatas Brasil players
Associação Portuguesa de Desportos players
Campeonato Brasileiro Série B players
Primeira Liga players
Campeonato de Portugal (league) players
Brazilian expatriate sportspeople in Portugal
Expatriate footballers in Portugal